Saint Dominic,  (8 August 1170 – 6 August 1221), also known as Dominic de Guzmán, was a Castilian Catholic priest, mystic, the founder of the Dominican Order and is the patron saint of astronomers and natural scientists. He is alternatively called Dominic of Osma, Dominic of Caleruega, and Domingo Félix de Guzmán.

Life

Birth and early life
Dominic was born in Caleruega, halfway between Osma and Aranda de Duero in Old Castile, Spain. He was named after Saint Dominic of Silos. The Benedictine abbey of Santo Domingo de Silos lies a few miles north of Caleruega.

In the earliest narrative source, by Jordan of Saxony, Dominic's parents are not named. The story is told that before his birth his barren mother made a pilgrimage to the Abbey at Silos, and dreamt that a dog leapt from her womb carrying a flaming torch in its mouth, and seemed to set the earth on fire. This story is likely to have emerged when his order became known, after his name, as the Dominican order, Dominicanus in Latin and a play on words interpreted as Domini canis: "Dog of the Lord." Jordan adds that Dominic was brought up by his parents and a maternal uncle who was an archbishop. The failure to name his parents is not unusual, since Jordan wrote a history of the Order's early years, rather than a biography of Dominic. A later source, still of the 13th century, gives their names as Juana and Felix. Nearly a century after Dominic's birth, a local author asserted that Dominic's father was "vir venerabilis et dives in populo suo" ("an honoured and wealthy man in his village"). The travel narrative of Pero Tafur, written circa 1439 (about a pilgrimage to Dominic's tomb in Italy), states that Dominic's father belonged to the family de Guzmán, and that his mother belonged to the Aça or Aza family. Dominic's mother, Joan of Aza, was beatified by Pope Leo XII in 1829.

Education and early career

At fourteen years of age, Dominic was sent to the Premonstratensian monastery of Santa María de La Vid and subsequently transferred for further studies in the schools of Palencia. In Palencia, he devoted six years to the arts and four to theology. At some point in time he also joined Santa María de La Vid as a canon.

In 1191, when Spain was desolated by famine, young Dominic gave away his money and sold his clothes, furniture, and even precious manuscripts to feed the hungry. Dominic reportedly told his astonished fellow students, "Would you have me study off these dead skins when men are dying of hunger?"

At the age of 24, Dominic was ordained as a priest, and subsequently joined the canonry of the Cathedral of Osma. In 1198, Diego de Acebo, the Bishop of Osma, having reformed the chapter and assigned himself as prior, made Dominic the subprior of the chapter.
 
In 1203 or 1204 he accompanied Diego de Acebo on a diplomatic mission for Alfonso VIII, King of Castile, to secure a bride in Denmark for crown prince Ferdinand. The envoys traveled to Denmark via Aragon and the south of France. The marriage negotiations ended successfully, but the princess died before leaving for Castile. During their return journey, they met with Cistercian monks who had been sent by Pope Innocent III to preach against the Cathars, a Christian religious sect with gnostic and dualistic beliefs which the Catholic Church deemed heretical. Dominic and Diego de Acebo attributed the Cistercians' lack of success to their extravagance and pomp compared to the asceticism of the Cathars. They decided to adopt a more ascetic way of life and began a program in the south of France to convert the Cathars. Catholic-Cathar debates were held at Verfeil, Pamiers and Montréal. Diego de Acebo later died, leaving Dominic alone in his mission.

Foundation of the Dominicans

In 1215, Dominic established himself, with six followers, in a house given by Peter Seila, a rich resident of Toulouse. Dominic saw the need for a new type of organization to address the spiritual needs of the growing cities of the era, one that would combine dedication and systematic education, with more organizational flexibility than either monastic orders or the secular clergy. He subjected himself and his companions to the monastic rules of prayer and penance; Bishop Foulques gave them written authority to preach throughout the territory of Toulouse.

Also in 1215, the year of the Fourth Lateran Council, Dominic and Foulques went to Rome to secure the approval of the Pope, Innocent III. Dominic returned to Rome a year later, and was finally granted written authority in December 1216 and January 1217 by the new pope, Honorius III, for him to form the Ordo Praedicatorum ("Order of Preachers").

In the winter of 1216–1217, at the house of Ugolino de' Conti, Dominic first met William of Montferrat, who joined Dominic as a friar in the Order of Preachers and remained a close friend.

Later life
Cecilia Cesarini, who was received by Dominic into his new order, in her old age described him as "...thin and of middle height. His face was handsome and somewhat fair. He had reddish hair and beard and beautiful eyes ... His hands were long and fine and his voice pleasingly resonant. He never got bald, though he wore the full tonsure, which was mingled with a few grey hairs."

Although he traveled extensively to maintain contact with his growing brotherhood of friars, Dominic made his headquarters in Rome. In 1219, Pope Honorius III invited Dominic and his companions to take up residence at the ancient Roman basilica of Santa Sabina, which they did by early 1220. Before that time the friars had only a temporary residence in Rome at the convent of San Sisto Vecchio, which Honorius III had given to Dominic circa 1218, intending it to become a convent for a reformation of nuns at Rome under Dominic's guidance. The official foundation of the Dominican convent at Santa Sabina with its studium conventuale, the first Dominican studium in Rome, occurred with the legal transfer of property from Pope Honorius III to the Order of Preachers on 5 June 1222, though the brethren had taken up residence there already in 1220. The studium at Santa Sabina was the forerunner of the studium generale at Santa Maria sopra Minerva. The latter would be transformed in the 16th century into the College of Saint Thomas, and then in the 20th century into the Pontifical University of Saint Thomas Aquinas, Angelicum sited at the convent of Saints Dominic and Sixtus.

Dominic arrived in Bologna on 21 December 1218. A convent was established at the Mascarella church by Reginald of Orleans. Soon afterwards they had to move to the church of San Nicolò of the Vineyards Dominic settled in this church and held here the first two General Chapters of the order.

According to Guiraud, Dominic abstained from meat, "observed stated fasts and periods of silence", "selected the worst accommodations and the meanest clothes", and "never allowed himself the luxury of a bed". "When travelling, he beguiled the journey with spiritual instruction and prayers". Guiraud also states that Dominic frequently traveled barefoot and that "rain and other discomforts elicited from his lips nothing but praises to God".

Dominic died at the age of fifty-one, according to Guiraud "exhausted with the austerities and labours of his career". He had reached the convent of St Nicholas at Bologna, Italy, "weary and sick with a fever". Guiraud states that Dominic "made the monks lay him on some sacking stretched upon the ground" and that "the brief time that remained to him was spent in exhorting his followers to have charity, to guard their humility, and to make their treasure out of poverty". He died at noon on 6 August 1221. His body was moved to a simple sarcophagus in 1233. Under the authority of Pope Gregory IX, Dominic was canonized in 1234. In 1267 Dominic's remains were moved to the shrine, made by Nicola Pisano and his workshop for the Church of St. Dominic in Bologna.

Dominic is honored in the Church of England and in the Episcopal Church on 8 August.

Inquisition

Dominic is commonly but apocryphally associated with the Inquisition. Historical sources from Dominic's own time period reveal nothing about his involvement in the Inquisition. Dominic died in 1221, and the office of the Inquisition was not established until 1231 in Lombardy and 1234 in Languedoc.

Canon 27 of the Third Council of the Lateran of 1179 stressed the duty of princes to repress heresy and condemned "the Brabantians, Aragonese, Basques, Navarrese, and others who practice such cruelty toward Christians that they respect neither churches nor monasteries, spare neither widows nor orphans, neither age nor sex, but after the manner of pagans, destroy and lay waste everything". This was followed in 1184 by a decretal of Pope Lucius III, Ad abolendam. This decreed that bishops were to investigate the presence of heresy within their respective dioceses. Practices and procedures of episcopal inquisitions could vary from one diocese to another, depending on the resources available to individual bishops and their relative interest or disinterest. Convinced that Church teaching contained revealed truth, the first recourse of bishops was that of persuasio. Through discourse, debates, and preaching, they sought to present a better explanation of Church teaching. This approach often proved very successful.

In 1231 Pope Gregory IX appointed a number of Papal Inquisitors, mostly Dominicans and Franciscans, for the various regions of Europe. As mendicants, they were accustomed to travel. Unlike the haphazard episcopal methods, the papal inquisition was thorough and systematic, keeping detailed records. This tribunal or court functioned in France, Italy and parts of Germany and had virtually ceased operation by the early fourteenth century.

In the 15th century, the Spanish Inquisition commissioned the artist Pedro Berruguete to depict Dominic presiding at an auto da fé. Thus, the Spanish inquisitors promoted a historical legend for the sake of auto-justification. Reacting against the Spanish tribunals, 16th- and 17th-century Protestant polemicists gladly developed and perpetuated the legend of Dominic the Inquisitor. This image gave German Protestant critics of the Catholic Church an argument against the Dominican Order whose preaching had proven to be a formidable opponent in the lands of the Reformation. As Edward Peters notes, "In Protestant historiography of the sixteenth century a kind of anti-cult of St. Dominic grew up."

Rosary

The spread of the Rosary, a Marian devotion, is attributed to the preaching of Dominic.  For centuries the Rosary has been at the heart of the Dominican Order. Pope Pius XI stated, "The Rosary of Mary is the principle and foundation on which the very Order of Saint Dominic rests for making perfect the life of its members and obtaining the salvation of others." For centuries, Dominicans have been instrumental in spreading the Rosary and emphasizing the Catholic belief in the power of the Rosary.

The feast of Saint Dominic is celebrated with great pomp and devotion in Malta, in the old city of Birgu and the capital city Valletta. The Dominican order has very strong links with Malta and Pope Pius V, a Dominican friar himself, aided the Knights of St. John to build the city of Valletta.

Cord of Saint Dominic 
Cord (belt) of Saint Dominic is a Catholic sacramental, which reminds the wearer about the protection of Saint Dominic. History of the cord is associated with the miraculous image of Saint Dominic in Soriano. The length of its strip suits to the perimeter of the painting. The beginning of the prayer "O wonderful hope" is placed on the cord. According to the tradition, if someone wants to receive grace from Saint Dominic, they should wear it all the time. Infertile couples use this cord to prayer for intercession of Saint Dominic to get the gift of offspring from God.

Toponymy
Saint Dominic is one of the few historical figures after whom two sovereign countries are named: Dominica and the Dominican Republic. The capital of the latter, Santo Domingo, also bears his name.

Veneration 

 25 January – commemoration of translation of relics to Church of Saint Roch,
 15 February – commemoration of the skull translation (1383),
 24 May – commemoration of first translation (1233),
 5 June – commemoration of second translation (1267)
 3 July – commemoration of canonization anniversary (1234)
 13 July – commemoration of canonization anniversary (1234)
 3 August – main commemoration (Australia)
 4 August – commemoration by (Traditional Roman Catholics),
 5 August – main commemoration (New Zealand)
 6 August – commemoration of death anniversary,
 7 August – main commemoration (Diocese of Sosnowiec, 8 August - anniversary of the dedication of cathedral church)
 8 August – main commemoration,
 15 September – commemoration of apparition of Saint Dominic in Soriano (traditional date)
 25 September – commemoration of apparition of Saint Dominic in Soriano (modern date)
 11 November – commemoration of third translation (1411)

See also 
 Arca di San Domenico: shrine containing the remains of Dominic
St. Dominic's Cathedral in Fuzhou: First established by Spanish Dominicans in 1864.
 Vardapet; traveling preachers of the Armenian Church
 Mother Marie-Anastasie
 Pattern of Urlaur: local Irish feast to honor Dominic
 Lives of the Brethren: commissioned by the General Chapter of 1256 to document the lives of early Dominicans
 Everton F.C., originally named Saint Domingo's F.C.
 Religiosam vitam
 Nos attendentes
 Saint Dominic in Soriano, a miraculous painting of 1530
 Saint Dominic, patron saint archive
 San Domenico di Guzman, a 1997 oratorio based on Dominic's life
 Statues of Madonna, Saint Dominic and Thomas Aquinas, Charles Bridge

References

Bibliography
  An excerpt is available online:  "The Holy Inquisition: Dominic and the Dominicans"

 
 
 Francis C. Lehner, ed., St Dominic: biographical documents. Washington: Thomist Press, 1964 Full text
 
 Pierre Mandonnet, M. H. Vicaire, St. Dominic and His Work. Saint Louis, 1948 Full text at Dominican Central
 Catholic Encyclopedia: St. Dominic by John B. O'Conner, 1909.
 
 
 
 
 Guy Bedouelle: Dominikus – Von der Kraft des Wortes. Styria, Graz/ Wien/ Köln 1984, .
 Jean-René Bouchet: Dominikus: Gefährte der Verirrten. from the Franz. von Michael Marsch. publisher's current texts, Heiligenkreuztal, 1989, .
 Peter Dyckhoff: Mit Leib und Seele beten. Illustrations and text of a mediaeval manuscript about the new form of prayer by Saint Dominic. .
 Paul D. Hellmeier: Dominikus begegnen. St.Ulrich Verlag, Augsburg, 2007, .
 Wolfram Hoyer (ed.): Jordan von Sachsen. Von den Anfängen des Predigerordens. (Dominikanische Quellen und Zeugnisse; Vol. 3). Benno, Leipzig, 2002, .
 Meinolf Lohrum: Dominikus. Benno, Leipzig, 1987, .
 Meinolf Lohrum: Dominikus. Beter und Prediger. M. Grünewald, Mainz, 1990, .

External links

 
 
 
  (translation by W. Caxton, First Edition in 1483)
 

1170 births
1221 deaths
People from the Province of Burgos
Spanish Dominicans
Dominican saints
Spanish Christian theologians
Founders of Catholic religious communities
Spanish Roman Catholic saints
Marian visionaries
Dominican spirituality
13th-century Christian saints
Burials at the Basilica of San Domenico
Pre-Reformation saints of the Lutheran liturgical calendar
Pre-Reformation Anglican saints
Masters of the Order of Preachers
Medieval Spanish theologians
13th-century Roman Catholic theologians
Anglican saints